Indrajit Lankesh is an Indian filmmaker, producer, and director of Kannada and Hindi films. He is also the publisher of the weekly Kannada tabloid Lankesh Patrike. He is the son of iconic writer, journalist and film maker P. Lankesh.

Lankesh comes from a prominent family of journalists and media publishers. His father P.Lankesh founded the highly successful weekly tabloid Lankesh Patrike. His sister Kavitha Lankesh is a filmmaker and his other sister Gauri Lankesh was a journalist/activist.

Early life of Indrajit Lankesh
Born in Shimoga, Indrajit was raised in Bangalore. He did his schooling at Kumarans and College in St. Joseph College Bangalore.

Indrajit played cricket for Karnataka State Junior Level and South Zone Junior level, moving on to represent 1st division Karnataka League. They were champions then. Indrajit excelled at his sports and was awarded the Best Wicket-keeper Award by C Nagaraj -the then Secretary of Karnataka State Cricket Association.

He as a sportsman and son of an iconic writer, journalist P. Lankesh, started a Kannada sports weekly –All-rounder.  It grew to be the highest selling Sports Weekly in Karnataka with a readership of 500,000.

Lankesh Patrike

Lankesh Patrike is an Indian vernacular weekly published in Kannada language from Bengaluru, Karnataka. The weekly newspaper was started by his father, P.Lankesh, in 1980—along the lines of Harijan, a weekly journal published by Mahatma Gandhi. The weekly remains to this day, true to its founding principles, having never published a single advertisement nor having generated any advertisement revenue, surviving on subscription from its readers alone. After working with All-rounder, Indrajit joined Lankesh Patrike as a sub-editor sometime in 1992–93. He now serves as the publisher and managing editor of the weekly newspaper.

Director

Lankesh began his career as a director in 2001. His debut film, Thuntata, was an Aniruddh – Rekha Vedavyas- Chaya Singh starrer, which won him the V. Shantaram Award for Best Debutant Director, along with the Shankarnag Award for the same. Following the success of Thuntata, Lankesh came up with a real-life incident based film Lankesh Patrike. Darshan and singer-turned-actor Vasundhara Das featured in this film.

In 2004, Lankesh directed the film Monalisa starring Dhyan and Sadha in the lead roles. This film brought him to the limelight again and he received the Karnataka State Film Award for Best Director and Best Film. Monalisa had a successful run of 25 weeks across Karnataka.  The film was one of the first Kannada films to be screened in the Multiplexes. The film Monalisa  also had a rare distinction of being dubbed in all South Indian languages.

In 2006, he directed the film Aishwarya starring Upendra in the lead. This was the debut film for the Bollywood actress Deepika Padukone. The film opened to full houses, and Lankesh won the Filmfare Award for Best Director.

Lankesh then went on to direct the commercial potboiler Huduga Hudugi, with Dhyan in the lead role. Actresses Sadha and Ileana made special appearances in the same film. In 2012, Lankesh's Diganth and Charmee Kaur starrer, Dev Son of Mudde Gowda released to mostly mixed reviews from the audience and critics alike.

In 2015 Lankesh directed Luv U Alia starring V. Ravichandran, Bhumika Chawla and Chandan Kumar.

In 2020, he directed Shakeela, starring Richa Chadda and Pankaj Tripathi  in the title role.

Religion work and others

Indrajit Lankesh belongs to a majority Veerashaiva Lingayat community in Karnataka. He is very active and committed to Veerashaiva Lingayat united religious movement. He is a role model to a lot of youngsters by inspiring them in his committed effort to keep the Veerashaiva Lingayat Dharma united.

He participated in a huge rally under the leadership of the Panchapeeta Sri Jagadguru from Rambapuri, Ujjain, Shreeshaila and Kashi. Indrajit Lankesh gave an inspiring speech in front of 500,000 audience gathered across India.

Indrajit Lankesh had also organized a huge function "Leaders in the footsteps of Basavanna" in Town Hall in Bangalore in 2017. Former chief minister Mr B.S. Yeddiyurappa presided over the function along with Veerashaiva Lingayat pontiffs Sri Sri Sirigere Taralabalu Swamiji. Sri Sri Suttur Swamiji and Sri Sri Siddaganga Swamiji. Ms Shoba Karandlaje was the chief guest. With a packed house filled with people across Karnataka, Indrajit Lankesh spoke and inspired people with the history of Basavanna and Veerashaiva Lingayat culture.

In the year 2020, Indrajit Lankesh was single-handedly  responsible in exposing and busting  the drug racket in Karnataka as-well as in the Kannada film industry. The drug case in Karnataka in 2020 made headlines nationally and internationally and Indrajit Lankesh was a champion in  fighting against the eradication of drugs. On the information given by the whistle blower Indrajit Lankesh a lot of celebrities were arrested and sent to jail for the consumption and peddling of drugs in Bengaluru, Karnataka. Indrajit Lankesh helped the CCB KARNATAKA intensively in confiscating  hundreds of crores of rupees worth of drugs in Karnataka. Indrajit Lankesh also added that the people who had been proven to be  indulging in drug abuse need to be given proper medical help to overcome this problem and the authorities need to look at this in an empathetic way as-well .

Philanthropy

Indrajit Lankesh also actively works in helping children of the lesser god, mentally challenged kids. He celebrates his birthday with them in their homes since 2000. He helps them with books, clothes and food every year. Indrajit Lankesh also educates two tribal kids since 2005 by looking after their education and school fees, etc.
Indrajit Lankesh also honoured late Lance Naik Hanumanthappa Koppad wife with Rs One Lakh after her husband's sad demise.

Indrajit Lankesh has also been condemning murders in Karnataka in the name of religion and caste. He has been actively protesting against politicising the issues, especially of Deepak Rao and Basheer. Lankesh also supported these families of the victims with monetary funds. Indrajit Lankesh also visited Dhanamma's family. Along with condolences message, Lankesh consoled them with financial aid. Dhanamma, a minor Dalit girl was brutally raped and killed in Vijaypura district in north Karnataka.
Indrajit Lankesh distributed free food kits for the poor and needy in Bengaluru during COVID-19 in 2020. Also he felicitated the senior actors in the Kannada film industry above 60 years who were struggling to get work during the COVID epidemic. The Indian government had made a rule that the actors above 60 years of age should not work to be safe from the carona virus. Indrajit lankesh also helped the senior actors with monetary funds.

Television

Indrajit Lankesh plays the permanent celebrity judge and is a household name with his presence and performance in Majaa Talkies, a family comedy show, is the longest run reality show in the history of Indian television. It has the highest TRP and the most popular show among Kannadigas across the world.

Filmography 
 Thuntata (2002)
Lankesh Patrike (2003)
 Monalisa (2004)
 Aishwarya (2006)
 Huduga Hudugi (2010)
 Dev Son of Mudde Gowda (2012)
 Luv U Alia (2016)
Shakeela (2020)

Awards and achievements

'''2019 Raghavendra chitravani best director Dr Vishnuvardhan award2020 Bangalore press club journalists award'''

References

External links
 
Official Website

Kannada film directors
21st-century Indian film directors
Filmfare Awards South winners
Living people
Film directors from Bangalore
1969 births
Film producers from Bangalore
Kannada film producers